A one-man band is a musician who plays a number of instruments simultaneously using their hands, feet, limbs, and various mechanical or electronic contraptions. One-man bands also often sing while they perform.

The simplest type of "one-man band" is a singer accompanying themselves on acoustic guitar and playing a harmonica mounted in a metal "harp rack" below the mouth. This approach is often taken by buskers and folk music singer-guitarists. More complicated setups may include wind instruments strapped around the neck, a large bass drum mounted on the musician's back with a beater which is connected to a foot pedal, cymbals strapped between the knees or triggered by a pedal mechanism, tambourines and maracas tied to the limbs, and a stringed instrument strapped over the shoulders (e.g., a banjo, ukulele or guitar).

Since the development of Musical Instrument Digital Interface (MIDI) in the 1980s, musicians have also incorporated chest-mounted MIDI drum pads, foot-mounted electronic drum triggers, and electronic pedal keyboards into their set-ups. In the 2000s and 2010s, the availability of affordable digital looping pedals has enabled singer-musicians to record a riff or chord progression and then solo or sing over it.

History and meanings

Live instruments

The earliest known records of multiple musical instruments being played at the same time date from the 13th century, and were the pipe and tabor. The pipe was a simple three-holed flute that could be played with one hand; the tabor is more commonly known today as a snare drum. This type of playing can still be heard in parts of rural France, in England and Spain. An Elizabethan-era woodcut shows a clown playing the pipe and tabor. An 1820s watercolour painting shows a one-man band with a rhythm-making stick, panpipes around his neck and a bass drum and tambourine beside him. Henry Mayhew's history of London street life in the 1840s and 1850s described a blind street performer who played bells, the violin and accordions.

One of the earliest modern exponents of multiple instruments was Jesse Fuller. Fuller developed a foot-operated bass instrument which he called the "footdella", which had six bass strings which were struck by hammers. In "one-man-band" shows, Fuller would use his "footdella", a footpedal-operated "sock" (hi-hat cymbal), a homemade neck harness (for a harmonica, kazoo and microphone), and a 12-string guitar. Fate Norris, of the Skillet Lickers, a hillbilly string band of the 1920s and early 1930s developed a geared mechanical contraption with footpedals that enabled him to play guitar, bells, bass fiddle, fiddle, autoharp and mouth harp.

"The one-man band exists, in all its uniqueness and independence, as a most elusive yet persistent musical tradition. As a category of musicianship it transcends cultural and geographic boundaries, spans stylistic limits, and defies conventional notions of technique and instrumentation. Defined simply as a single musician playing more than one instrument at the same time, it is an ensemble limited only by the mechanical capabilities and imaginative inventiveness of its creator, and despite its generally accepted status as an isolated novelty, it is a phenomenon with some identifiable historical continuity."

Studio recording
The term "one-man band" is also colloquially used to describe a performer who plays every instrument on a recorded song one at a time, and then mixes them together in a multitrack studio. While this approach to recording is more common in electronica genres such as techno and acid house than R&B and rock music, some R&B and rock performers such as Joe Hill Louis, Stevie Wonder, Prince, Lenny Kravitz, Paul McCartney, Elliott Smith, Kevin Parker, Kabir Suman, Dave Edmunds, John Fogerty, Emitt Rhodes, Todd Rundgren, Pete Townshend, Steve Winwood, Roy Wood, Nik Kershaw, Dave Grohl (Foo Fighters), and Les Fradkin have made records in which they play every instrument (one after the other). Mike Oldfield was noted for using this recording technique during the recording of his 1973 album Tubular Bells. Other examples of a one-man band in the recording studio are Dave Grohl for the first studio album by the Foo Fighters, Trent Reznor for Nine Inch Nails, jazz piano player Keith Jarrett for his album No End, Peter Tägtgren for Pain (musical project), Chris Carrabba for the first two albums released by Dashboard Confessional, Varg Vikernes for Burzum and Billy Corgan for The Smashing Pumpkins since 2009.

Nash the Slash (1948–2014) played all instruments on his recordings. He also played solo concerts from 1975 to 2012, using synchronized drum machines and synthesizers as he plays either an electric violin or electric mandolin. Some artists record and mixed their music in a multitrack studio and synchronize it with video multitrack video playing on all instruments, creating a one-man band illusion.

One-man bands in this context have become more common in extreme metal, especially black metal, where a number of bands apart from Burzum consist of only one member. Such artists include Nargaroth, Xasthur, Falkenbach, Arckanum, Nortt, Horde, and others. While most of these bands do not play live, some such as Nargaroth hire additional musicians for live performances.

"One-woman band" is not used very often in the vernacular, but women have increasingly had a presence as musicians in most forms of music. Examples of one-woman bands are Merrill Garbus, who performs as Tune-Yards and plays every instrument on all recordings , and Edith Crash who creates "dark and haunting, drawn-out melodies".

Live looping

In the 2000s, as digital looping pedals became widely available, performers have been able to use a mixture of previously recorded music, delay effects, and looping devices in live performances of everything from beatboxing to classical violin. Live looping performers create layered looped accompaniment for musical solos that are sung or played later in the song. Using this technology, a simultaneous combination of various instruments and vocals, or one instrument played in different ways, can be created over the course of one musical piece which rivals the sounds of studio recording. Notable artists who incorporate this technique live include Ed Sheeran, Keller Williams, That 1 Guy, Zach Deputy, and KT Tunstall. Rick Walker is another looper and multi-instrumentalist who has organized looping festivals, including a long-running annual one in Santa Cruz, California, and others in various countries.

Developments

Since the development of Musical Instrument Digital Interface (MIDI) in the 1980s, musicians have also incorporated chest-mounted MIDI drum pads, foot-mounted electronic drum triggers. Some "one-man bands" use organ-style pedal keyboards to perform basslines. A small number of MIDI enthusiasts use custom-made MIDI controllers connected to different parts of their bodies to trigger music on synthesizers. Custom-made MIDI controllers range from wind-operated controllers to small triggers mounted on the arms or feet. At a certain point, the use of body MIDI controllers may come to resemble performance art, because the musical sounds are triggered by the performer assuming certain poses or dancing. One of the pioneers of this performance art is McRorie Live Electronic, who uses drum sensors on his shoes, tom sensors on his chest, separate rhythm and bass keyboards and vocal lead instruments.

With the rise in availability and affordability of electronic devices came innovation with the traditional acoustic "one-man band" instruments. One example is the Farmer Footdrums company based in the US. The company sells acoustic foot-played percussion instruments that allow musicians to play a range of traditional drum kit sounds. Musicians are now able to record each instrument individually and then compile a video as if it were all done in real time.

Non-musical meanings

The term is also used in a general sense to refer to a person who runs a small business alone (a sole-proprietorship business), particularly if the operation requires that person to assume multiple different roles, in a manner akin to the way a musical "one-man band" performer plays different instruments and sings at the same time. In some small businesses, the owner also produces the product or service, markets it and delivers it to clients. In TV news, the phrase refers to a reporter who also functions as their own cameraperson via the use of a tripod.

In 2011, professional wrestler Heath Slater climbed to fame with the nickname "The One-Man Rock Band", which was later changed to "The One-Man Southern Rock Band" in reference to his being billed from West Virginia.

References

 
Street performance
Music performance
Accompaniment